Ramsey Fill is one of the fills (embankments) on the Lackawanna Cut-Off railroad line in northwest New Jersey.  Located between miles 60.4 and 60.9 in Frelinghuysen Township, the fill was constructed between 1908 and 1911 by contractor Hyde, McFarlan & Burke. The  fill has an average height of 21 feet (6.5 m), and a maximum height of 80 feet (24.6 m).  It was created with 805,481 cubic yards of fill material obtained by blasting with dynamite or other methods.

Ramsey Fill is on a tangent (straight) section of track, permitting 80 mph (129 km/hr).  Johnsonburg Station was located about midway along the fill, just east of Armstrong Cut.

It is named for Stewart W. Ramsey, who owned most of the land acquired to build it.

References 

Lackawanna Cut-Off